Giancarlo de' Medici (24 July 1611 – 22 January 1663) was an Italian cardinal of the House of Medici. He was the second son of Grand Duke Cosimo II of Tuscany and his wife, Maria Maddalena of Austria, and the brother of Ferdinando II de' Medici, Grand Duke of Tuscany.

Biography
He was born at Florence, the second son and third child of Cosimo II de' Medici, Grand Duke of Tuscany and Maria Maddalena of Austria. He entered the ecclesiastical state at a young age.  In 1620 he joined the Sovereign Military Order of Malta and was named Grand Prior of Pisa.  In 1638 he was named General of the Mediterranean Sea.

On 14 November 1644 Pope Innocent X created Giancarlo a cardinal-deacon as a token of his affection toward the Medici. Thus forced to give up his military career and with it the title of "General of the Spanish Seas", Giancarlo could not reconcile himself to his new "religious" lifestyle.

Cardinal de' Medici participated in the papal conclave, 1655 as one of leaders of the Spanish faction. Pope Alexander VII made Giancarlo responsible for welcoming Queen Christina of Sweden, a new convert to Catholicism, to Rome in 1655. Upon discovering of the closeness that had formed between the two, the Pope sent Gian Carlo back to Florence, declaring him "too handsome and too young" to be "spiritual advisor" to the Queen.

Here, Giancarlo led a life of dissipation, taking many mistresses; nevertheless, Ferdinando II delegated to him the management of the state's financial affairs. He was patron of science, letters and music. He founded the Accademia degli Immobili and contributed to the construction of Teatro della Pergola and the enrichment of the Galleria Palatina di Palazzo Pitti.

In later years, Giancarlo donated his sizeable art collection to form the Pitti Gallery. He died at Florence, of an apoplexy, at the age of 51, and was interred in the Medicean necropolis, the Basilica of San Lorenzo, Florence.

Four years after the death of Giancarlo, his younger brother Leopoldo was created a cardinal.

Ancestors

References

Sources
Acton, Harold: The Last Medici, Macmillan, London, 1980, 
Young, G.F.: The Medici: Volume II, John Murray, London, 1920

Giancarlo
17th-century Italian cardinals
1611 births
1663 deaths
Tuscan princes
Burials at San Lorenzo, Florence
Sons of monarchs